The 1950 Giro d'Italia was the 33rd edition of the Giro d'Italia, one of cycling's Grand Tours. The three-week  race of 18 stages with two rest days, started in Milan on 24 May and finished at the Rome on 13 June.

Teams
Majority of Italian cyclists

  (riders)
  (riders)
  (riders)
  (riders)
  (riders)
  (riders)
  (riders)
  (riders)
  (riders)
  (riders)
  (riders)
  (riders)
  (riders)

Majority of French cyclists

  (riders)

Majority of Swiss cyclists

  (riders)

Cyclists

By starting number

By team

By nationality

References

Citations

1950 Giro d'Italia
1950